Retinoic acid (used simplified here for all-trans-retinoic acid) is a metabolite of vitamin A1 (all-trans-retinol) that mediates the functions of vitamin A1 required for growth and development.  All-trans-retinoic acid is required in chordate animals, which includes all higher animals from fish to humans. During early embryonic development, all-trans-retinoic acid generated in a specific region of the embryo helps determine position along the embryonic anterior/posterior axis by serving as an intercellular signaling molecule that guides development of the posterior portion of the embryo. It acts through Hox genes, which ultimately control anterior/posterior patterning in early developmental stages.

All-trans-retinoic acid (ATRA) is the major occurring retinoic acid, while isomers like 13-cis- and 9-cis-retinoic acid are also present in much lower levels.

The key role of all-trans-retinoic acid in embryonic development mediates the high teratogenicity of retinoid pharmaceuticals, such as isotretinoin (13-cis-retinoic acid) used for treatment of cancer and acne. Oral megadoses of preformed vitamin A (retinyl palmitate), and all-trans-retinoic acid itself, also have teratogenic potential by this same mechanism.

Mechanism of biological action 

All-trans-retinoic acid acts by binding to the retinoic acid receptor (RAR), which is bound to DNA as a heterodimer with the retinoid X receptor (RXR) in regions called retinoic acid response elements (RAREs). Binding of the all-trans-retinoic acid ligand to RAR alters the conformation of the RAR, which affects the binding of other proteins that either induce or repress transcription of a nearby gene (including Hox genes and several other target genes). RARs mediate transcription of different sets of genes controlling differentiation of a variety of cell types, thus the target genes regulated depend upon the target cells. In some cells, one of the target genes is the gene for the retinoic acid receptor itself (RAR-beta in mammals), which amplifies the response. Control of retinoic acid levels is maintained by a suite of proteins that control synthesis and degradation of retinoic acid.

The molecular basis for the interaction between all-trans-retinoic acid and the Hox genes has been studied by using deletion analysis in transgenic mice carrying constructs of GFP reporter genes. Such studies have identified functional RAREs within flanking sequences of some of the most 3′ Hox genes (including HOXA1, HOXB1, HOXB4, HOXD4), suggesting a direct interaction between the genes and retinoic acid. These types of studies strongly support the normal roles of retinoids in patterning vertebrate embryogenesis through the Hox genes.

Biosynthesis 
All-trans-retinoic acid can be produced in the body by two sequential oxidation steps that convert all-trans-retinol to retinaldehyde to all-trans-retinoic acid, but once produced it cannot be reduced again to all-trans-retinol. The enzymes that generate retinoic acid for regulation of gene expression include retinol dehydrogenase (Rdh10) that metabolizes retinol to retinaldehyde, and three types of retinaldehyde dehydrogenase, i.e. ALDH1A1 (RALDH1), ALDH1A2 (RALDH2), and ALDH1A3 (RALDH3) that metabolize retinaldehyde to retinoic acid. Enzymes that metabolize excess all-trans-retinol to prevent toxicity include alcohol dehydrogenase and cytochrome P450 (CYP26).

Function in the absence of precursors 

All-trans-retinoic acid is responsible for most of the activity of vitamin A1, save visual pigment effects that require retinal (retinaldehyde), and cell metabolism effects that may require retinol itself. Also, some biochemical functions necessary for fertility in vitamin A deficient male and female mammals originally appeared to require all-trans-retinol for rescue, but this is due to a requirement for local conversion of all-trans-retinol to all-trans-retinoic acid, as administered all-trans-retinoic acid does not reach some critical tissues unless given in high amounts. Thus, if animals are fed only all-trans-retinoic acid but no vitamin A1 (all-trans-retinol or retinal), they suffer none of the growth-stunting or epithelial-damaging effects of lack of vitamin A1 (including no xerophthalmia—dryness of the cornea). They do suffer retina degeneration and blindness, due to retinal deficiency.

In addition, vitamin A1-deprived but all-trans-retinoic acid-supplemented male rats exhibit hypogonadism and infertility due to lack of local retinoic acid synthesis in the testis; similar treatment of female rats causes infertility due to fetal resorption caused by a lack of local retinoic acid synthesis in the embryo. The retinoic acid synthesis in testes is catalyzed primarily by the ALDH1A2 (RALDH2) aldehyde dehydrogenase. Suppressing this enzyme has been proposed as a possible way to make a male contraceptive pill, because retinoic acid is necessary for spermatogenesis in humans, much as in rats.

Function in embryonic development 
Al-trans-retinoic acid (ATRA) is a morphogen signaling molecule, which means it is concentration dependent; malformations can arise when the concentration of ATRA is in excess or deficient. Other molecules that interact with ATRA are FGF8, Cdx and Hox genes, all participating in the development of various structures within the embryo. For example, ATRA plays an important role in activating Hox genes required for hindbrain development. The hindbrain, which later differentiates into the brain stem, serves as a major signaling center defining the border of the head and trunk. A double-sided  retinoic acid gradient, that is high in the trunk and low at the junction with the head and tail, represses FGF8 in the developing trunk to allow normal somitogenesis, forelimb bud initiation, and formation of the atria in the heart. During exposure to excess ATRA, the hindbrain becomes enlarged, hindering the growth of other parts of the brain; other developmental abnormalities that can occur during excess ATRA are missing or fused somites, and problems with the aorta and large vessels within the heart. With an accumulation of these malformations, an individual can be diagnosed with DiGeorge syndrome. However, since ATRA partakes in various developmental processes, abnormalities associated with loss of ATRA are not just limited to sites associated with DiGeorge syndrome. Retinoic acid is essential throughout an individual's lifetime, but it is most critical during pregnancy. Without the proper concentrations of ATRA, severe abnormalities can be present and even fatal to the growing fetus. Genetic loss-of-function studies in mouse and zebrafish embryos that eliminate ATRA synthesis or ATRA receptors (RARs) have revealed abnormal development of the somites, forelimb buds, heart, hindbrain, spinal cord, eye, forebrain basal ganglia, kidney, foregut endoderm, etc.

Related pharmaceuticals
Talarozole 
Tretinoin / all-trans-retinoic acid (Tradename: Retin-A)
Isotretinoin / 13-cis-retinoic acid (Tradename: Accutane(US), Roaccutane)

References

External links 
 Retinoic acid bound to proteins in the PDB

Carboxylic acids
Cell communication
Cell signaling
Apocarotenoids
Cyclohexenes